The Dauphin's Entry Into Paris is an oil on canvas painting by Jean-Auguste-Dominique Ingres, executed in 1821. It is now in the Wadsworth Atheneum collection in  Hartford, Connecticut.

It belongs to the painter's Troubador style period and shows the future Charles V of France returning to Paris on 2 August 1358 after a revolt there. It was commissioned by Amédée-David Pastoret, whose ancestor Jehan Pastoret, president of the parliament of Paris, is shown in red.

Bibliography
Daniel Ternois, Ingres, Paris, Fernand Nathan,  1980
Robert Rosenblum, Ingres, Paris, Cercle d'Art, coll. « La Bibliothèque des Grands Peintres »,  1986

Paintings by Jean-Auguste-Dominique Ingres
1821 paintings
Horses in art
Paintings in the Wadsworth Atheneum